This is a list of bridges and viaducts in Bhutan, including those for pedestrians and vehicular traffic.

Historical and architectural interest bridges 
Cantilever beams were developed in order to cross increasingly wide streams or rivers, where simple wooden beams had a limited range of about 10 meters. Two arms with timber superimposed are built on either side of the river, above the highest flood-level point, while being weighted to allow an increasingly large cantilevering, and solid wooden beams are then fixed on each end of the arms with wooden pegs. The main purpose of these towers was to act as a counterweight to stiffen the structure.

The use of more layers of wooden beams with more pronounced inclinations permit to achieve greater spans, one of the most significant example is the Wangdue Zam with a span reported from  according to different sources.

All these bridges are called Bazam, a word composed of Ba which means Cattle and Zam who is the traduction of Bridge in Dzongkha, the national language of Bhutan. This comes from the resemblance of the cantilever beams that sit opposite each other with two noses of cattle.

A major innovation was created by Thang Tong Gyalpo regarding the crossing of large spans, he developed iron chains working techniques and adapted them to the construction of bridges. By adding arsenic to the iron (a bit more than 2.8%), it was easier to work with and had good resistance against rust, some of these chains are still functional today.

After making more than a hundred such bridges in Tibet, Thang Tong Gyalpo came to Bhutan in 1433 where he found big iron ore deposits and locals blacksmiths, many chains forged here were shipped from Bhutan to Tibet. He build 8 bridges in the country, oftentime near ore deposits, and some of them were still in use in the 20ht century, the last existing bridges are Tamchog Chakzam, Doksum Chakzam, Dangme Chakzam, and Khoma Chakzam (Chakzam literally means "iron bridge" in standard Tibetan).

Major road bridges 

See also 

 Transport in Bhutan
 Geography of Bhutan
 List of rivers of Bhutan
 Architecture of Bhutan

Notes and references 
 Notes

 

 Others references

Further reading

External links 

 
 
 
 
 
 
 

Bhutan
Bridges
Bridges